Johannes Lucius (September 1604 – 11 January 1679) was a Dalmatian historian, whose greatest work is De regno Dalmatiae et Croatiae ("On the Kingdom of Dalmatia and Croatia"), which includes valuable historical sources, a bibliography and six historical maps. Due to his critical approach, he is considered the founder of Croatian historiography.

Born in September 1640 in Trogir in a noble family, Lucius studied in Trogir and Rome, graduating philosophy, mathematics, political sciences and literature in 1628, and receiving Ph.D. in civil and canonical law in 1630. Following graduation, he worked as councilmen and judge in his hometown and developed intensive scientific-research work. His first book Vita B. Ioannis confessoris episcopi Traguriensis et eius miracula [Life of St. John the Confessor, Bishop of Trogir] (1657) is an important source of Croatian, and especially Dalmatian, history between 11th and 13th centuries. His capital work is De regno Dalmatiae et Croatiae [On the Kingdom of Dalmatia and Croatia] (1662) in which he described the history of Dalmatia between the Roman times and 1480. The book contains the genealogy of Croatian dukes and kings and six historical Illyrian maps, regarded in Croatia as "the first Croatian atlas". The best known is map no. 6, Illyricum hodiernum [Present-day Illyricum], which Lucius dedicated to the Croatian ban Petar Zrinski, later included in Blaeu's Atlas Maior. In the book Memorie istoriche di Tragurio ora detto Traù [Historical testimonies about Trogir, now called Traù], he described the history of Trogir and Dalmatia to the mid 15th century. His book Inscriptiones Dalmaticae [Dalmatian Inscriptions] (1673) contains inscriptions and epigraphic monuments from Dalmatian heritage. In addition to his many other historical works, Lucius also engaged in archeology, geography, mathematics, physics, astronomy, construction and studying of ancient Christian monuments, Roman mosaics and inscriptions.

He was a member of the Pontifical Croatian College of St. Jerome in whose catacombs he was buried after his death in January 1679. Today, Lucius is widely regarded in Croatia as "the father of modern Croatian historiography".

Life and works 

Johannes was the son of Peter Lucius and Clara Difnico, born in Trogir, Venetian Dalmatia (now Croatia). After some schooling in his hometown, he went to Rome, where he spent two years, and then obtained his Ph.D. in ecclesiastical and civil law in the University of Padua. He returned to Trogir, and held various offices, but he returned to Rome in 1654. There he became a member of the Fraternity of Saint Jerome, and then its president. He participated in the work of many scientific academies of his age and wrote to scientists from Dalmatia, Italy and Europe.

He wrote a number of historical works in Italian and Latin. His greatest and most famous work is De regno Dalmatiae et Croatiae (The Kingdom of Dalmatia and Croatia). The book was published after the war of Candia, a critical moment for the Republic of Venice. In his book Lucius pointed out the difference between the Romance and Slavic Dalmatia, the habits of the people and the cultural borderlines.

It was first printed in Amsterdam in 1666. This book provides an overview of both, the history of Dalmatia and history of Croatia, from the prehistory to the 15th century. While his predecessors and contemporaries used suppositions as much as facts, Lucius founded his estimates on genuine sources. At the end of the book, he included certain valuable historical sources and a bibliography with his comments. The book had six historical maps. One of maps, the historical map Illyricum hodiernum (today's Illyria) was dedicated by Joan Blaeu, Lucius' publisher to the Croatian ban Petar Zrinski. Since everyone was looking up to antiquity, the Zrinski believed their ancestors were Roman aristocrats. Lucius showed them that their roots reached back to the famous medieval dukes of Šubićs noble family from Bribir.

Lucius participated in the dispute about the authenticity of the text of Trimalchio's Banquet by the Roman satirist Petronius, which had been found in Trogir.

He also published the history of his home town in Memoriae istoriche di Tragurio, ora detto Trau ("Trogir in Historical Literature"; 1673). He also published a book of Roman inscriptions from Dalmatia, including the inscriptions collected by the famous Croatian poet and writer Marko Marulić. Shortly before his death, Lucius prepared the Statute of Trogir for printing.

Lucius was never married. He resided in Rome until his death, and was buried there, in the Church of St. Jerome. A monument was erected to his memory in 1740.

Significance 
Johannes Lucius was the first Dalmatian historian who critically examined and used historical sources: documents and chronicles, inscriptions and last wills. His historical methodology was far ahead of his time.

He corresponded with many famous people from Republic of Ragusa (Dubrovnik), especially Stefano Gradi, the head of the Vatican Library. His numerous letters, revealing him as a man of integrity and a skillful writer are a valuable fresco of the conditions of his time.

Lucius' work, written in a lapidary and clear style, based on critical considerations, is the cornerstone of the modern historiography about Dalmatia. Today in Croatia, Lucius is considered the father of modern contemporary Croatian historiography.

Works 
The following are his principal published works:
De Regno Dalmatiae et Croatiae libri sex (6 vols., Venice, 1673);
Inscriptiones Dalmaticae, notae ad memoriale Pauli de Paulo, notae ad Palladium Fuscum, addenda vel corrigenda in opere de regno Dalmatiae et Croatiae, variae lectiones Chronici Ungarici manuscripti cum editis (Venice, 1673).

References

External links 

Ivan Lučić Lucius - father of Croatian historiography

1604 births
1679 deaths
17th-century Venetian historians
Venetian period in the history of Croatia
University of Padua alumni
People from Trogir
History of Dalmatia
Italian-language writers
Venetian Slavs